Edward Ferrero (January 18, 1831 – December 11, 1899) was one of the leading dance instructors, choreographers, and ballroom operators in the United States. He also served as a Union Army general in the American Civil War, being most remembered for his conduct unbecoming in the Battle of the Crater (July 1864), where he was reported to have been drinking with another general behind the lines as both their units were virtually destroyed.

Early life and career
Ferrero was born in Granada, Spain. His parents were natives of Italy, and had just arrived in Spain when their son was born. Thirteen months later, the family moved to the United States and settled in New York City. Ferrero's father, a noted dancer and a personal friend of the revolutionary General Giuseppe Garibaldi, soon opened a dance academy. When the elder Ferrero retired in his early fifties, Edward took over operation of the academy. He educated the wealthy and elite of New York society in the art of dance, and originated many dances that spread in popularity throughout the country. Ferrero became renowned as one of America's leading experts in dance. He worked part-time as a dance instructor at the United States Military Academy and was the author of The Art of Dancing in 1859.

Ferrero was interested in military affairs from his association as a youth with Garibaldi, and from his uncle, Colonel Lewis Ferrero, who had served in the Crimean War and the Italian campaign. Edward Ferrero became the lieutenant colonel of the 11th New York Militia Regiment, serving for six years in the militia organization. With his skills in choreography and instruction, his troops soon became known for their parade ground precision and military drill.

Civil War
With the outbreak of the Civil War in early 1861, Ferrero raised a regiment at his own expense, the 51st New York Volunteer Infantry Regiment (the "Shepard Rifles"). He was commissioned as its first colonel and drilled the regiment in military procedures. He led a brigade of three regiments in Maj. Gen. Ambrose Burnside's expedition to Roanoke Island, where his regiment seized the first fortified Confederate redoubt captured in the war. He also commanded a brigade at New Bern under Brig. Gen. Jesse L. Reno.

Transferred northward with his brigade to Virginia in the summer of 1862, he served in the army of Maj. Gen. John Pope during the Northern Virginia Campaign, including the Second Battle of Bull Run. In September, he served at the battles of South Mountain and Antietam, where his brigade was a part of the Union IX Corps and stormed Burnside's Bridge. For his personal bravery at Antietam, the dancer-turned-warrior was promoted to brigadier general of volunteers on September 19, 1862. (This commission expired in March 1863, but he was reappointed to rank from May 6. The latter appointment was revoked on July 21, 1864). His first action as a general was at Fredericksburg.

Sent to the Western Theater along with the IX Corps in early 1863, Ferrero led his brigade with distinction during the Siege of Vicksburg. He subsequently commanded a division during the Knoxville Campaign, and was in command of the defenses of Fort Sanders. Transferred eastward again in 1864 with the corps, he served in the Siege of Petersburg, commanding a division of black troops. His men were involved in the ill-fated July 30 charge on the Crater, where they suffered significant losses supporting the initial attack of Brig. Gen. James H. Ledlie's division. Both Ferrero and Ledlie received criticism for remaining in a shelter behind the lines through most of the battle, passing a bottle of rum between them. A court of inquiry headed by Maj. Gen. Winfield S. Hancock cited Ferrero for "being in a bomb-proof habitually, where he could not see the operation of his troops [nor know] the position of two brigades of his division or whether they had taken Cemetery Hill or not."

On December 2, 1864, Ferrero was breveted major general for "bravery and meritorious services." He served throughout the Appomattox Campaign in early 1865.

Postbellum
Ferrero mustered out of the army on August 24, 1865, and returned home to New York City. He chose not to reopen his previous dance academy, but instead leased a building in a new location, eventually turning it into a world-famed ballroom known as Apollo Hall, 31 West 28th Street at Broadway. In 1872, he terminated his lease and the building was converted into a theater.

Ferrero leased the ballroom of Tammany Hall for his academy and joined the Tammany Society, becoming socially active in Democratic political circles, although he never ran for office. He was active in veterans affairs, including the Grand Army of the Republic and the Loyal Legion. He also joined the Freemasons. He published a second best-selling book, The History of Dancing, which remains in print today.

He leased the Lenox Lyceum in January 1889 and continued as one of the country's foremost dance instructors for another decade. He retired in May 1899 when he became ill with a variety of ailments that claimed his life by the end of the year.

Ferrero died in New York City and is buried in Green-Wood Cemetery, Brooklyn.

Ferrero's books
 The Art of Dancing Historically Illustrated to Which is Added a Few Hints on Etiquette .
 The History of Dancing .

See also

 List of American Civil War generals (Union)

Notes

References
 Eicher, John H., and Eicher, David J., Civil War High Commands, Stanford University Press, 2001, .
 Warner, Ezra J., Generals in Blue: Lives of the Union Commanders, Louisiana State University Press, 1964, .
 New York Times obituary

External links

 
 Antietam on the Web
 
 New York Press article on Ferrero
 New York State Military Museum press clippings and brief biography
 Green-Wood Cemetery Burial Search

Union Army generals
People of New York (state) in the American Civil War
American people of Italian descent
1831 births
1899 deaths
Burials at Green-Wood Cemetery
American choreographers
New York (state) Democrats